Cocchi Americano  (pronounced: /ˈkɔkki ameriˈkano/) is a quinine-flavored aperitif wine produced by Giulio Cocchi Spumanti in the Asti province of Italy. Cocchi Americano is a variety of Americano. The wine was developed by Giulio Cocchi, and production began in 1891. Cocchi also produces a pink variety of this aperitif, the "Cocchi Americano Rosa", which is slightly more bitter and aromatic than the standard white Cocchi Americano.

Press and awards 
Cocchi Americano gained prominence from its use in James Bond's Vesper as a substitute for Kina Lillet, which is no longer available. It is also used in the Corpse Reviver #2 and in other cocktails.

Cocchi Americano is generally considered to be the nearest contemporary drink to the original Kina Lillet and is often used as a replacement.

References

Aromatised wine
Italian wine